The following is a list of telenovelas produced by Televisa in the 1970s.

1970

1971

1972

1973

1974

1975

1976

1977

1978

1979

References 

Televisa 1970s
Mexican television-related lists
 1970s